"Lo Poco Que Tengo" ("What Little That I Have") is a song written by Guatemalan singer-songwriter Ricardo Arjona for his fourteenth studio album, Viaje. The song was released the song as the second single from the record, on April 22, 2014.

Charts

Year-end charts

References

2014 songs
2014 singles
Ricardo Arjona songs
Songs written by Ricardo Arjona